Ambushed is the debut studio album by American hip hop group Da Bush Babees, with members Mr. Man, Babe-B-Face Kaos and Y-Tee. It was released on December 6, 1994, under Reprise Records. It peaked at number 83 on the Billboard Top R&B/Hip-Hop Albums chart. "We Run Things (It's Like Dat)" and "Remember We" peaked at number 41 and 34, respectively, on the Hot Rap Songs chart.

Track listing

Charts

References

External links
 

1994 debut albums
Da Bush Babees albums
Reprise Records albums
Albums produced by Jermaine Dupri
Albums produced by Mark Batson
Albums produced by Salaam Remi